Vahdettin Özkan (born 1968) is a Turkish bureaucrat who has served as the 46th Governor of Isparta since August 2013, having been appointed by President Abdullah Gül on the recommendation of the Turkish Government. He previously served as the 10th Governor of Şırnak from 2010 to 2013. He is a former Kaymakam (Sub-Governor of a district).

Early life
Born in 1968 in Muş, he graduated from Istanbul University Faculty of Political Science in 1989. He subsequently became a Kaymakam candidate in Bingöl from 1990 to 1993.

Bureaucratic career
Özkan became the Kaymakam of Ilıca, in Erzurum Province in 1993 and served until 1995. He later served as the Kaymakam for Bahçesaray in Van Province from 1995 to 1997, after which he was appointed Deputy Governor of Van and served until 2000. Between 2003 and 2004, he served Deputy Governor of Diyarbakır. After briefly working at the Ministry of the Interior between 2004 and 2006, he was appointed the 10th Governor of Şırnak in 2010 and served until 2013. He was then re-appointed as the 46th Governor of Isparta.

See also
Governor (Turkey)
List of Turkish civil servants

References

External links
Website of the Governor of Isparta
Website of the Governor of Şırnak

Living people
People from Muş
Turkish politicians
1968 births
Turkish civil servants